Mareco is a surname. Notable people with the surname include:

Juan Carlos Mareco (1926–2009), Uruguayan actor
Sandro Mareco (born 1987), Argentine chess grandmaster
Víctor Mareco (born 1984), Paraguayan footballer

See also
Mareco Broadcasting Network, a radio network in the Philippines
Marecos